Rosebush may refer to:
 The rose plant
 Rosebush, Pembrokeshire, Wales
 Rosebush, Michigan, United States
 Rosebush (ship), a ship of the British Royal Navy in the 1660s